John Anthony Pescatore  (born February 2, 1964) is an American rower. He competed in the 1988 Seoul Olympic Games for the United States as stroke of the men's coxed eight which placed third. He later competed at the 1992 Barcelona Olympic Games in the men's coxless pair. Then in 2000 he was placed top coach in America for coaching the coxless pair to silver at the 2000 Sydney Olympic Games. Pescatore was also in the 1987 eight that won the world championships in Copenhagen, Denmark.

Pescatore graduated in 1986 from the University of Pennsylvania where, as captain, he stroked the men's varsity eight to victory at the Eastern Sprints. He was the head coach of rowing at Yale University from 2002 to 2010.

See also
 College Boat Club

References

External links

1964 births
Living people
Olympic bronze medalists for the United States in rowing
American male rowers
World Rowing Championships medalists for the United States
Medalists at the 1988 Summer Olympics
Penn Quakers rowers
Yale Bulldogs rowing coaches
Rowers at the 1988 Summer Olympics
Rowers at the 1992 Summer Olympics